Ethnikos Sochos Football Club is a Greek football club based in Sochos, Thessaloniki, Greece.

Honors

Domestic
 Macedonia FCA Champions: 1
 2019-20
 Macedonia FCA Second Division Champions: 1
 2017-18

References

Thessaloniki
Association football clubs established in 1957
1957 establishments in Greece
Gamma Ethniki clubs